"Strife" is a song by American heavy metal band Trivium. It was released as the second single from the band's sixth studio album Vengeance Falls.

Background
"Strife" made its debut during the band's performance at Wacken Open Air on August 3, 2013. A studio recording of the song was released a few weeks later as a single on August 20.

Reception
Several reviews of Vengeance Falls highlighted "Strife" as the album's top track.

Dan Slessor of Alternative Press called "Strife" a "state-of-the-art metallic anthem." Ridge Briel of New Noise Magazine described the song as "an anthemic Shogun-esque track, with soaring riffs and a thick bass tone that captures Trivium at one of the high points of the album."

Commercial
"Strife" was a minor hit on American rock radio following its release. The single peaked at no. 24 on the Billboard Mainstream Rock chart on March 15, 2014, the band's highest charting single at the time; this would be surpassed with "Until the World Goes Cold" from the band's following album Silence in the Snow.

Track listing
CD single

10" single

Charts

Personnel
Matt Heafy – lead vocals, guitars
Corey Beaulieu – guitars, backing vocals
Paolo Gregoletto – bass, backing vocals
Nick Augusto – drums

References

External links
Official Music Video on YouTube

2013 songs
2013 singles
Roadrunner Records singles
Trivium (band) songs
Songs written by Matt Heafy
Songs written by Corey Beaulieu
Songs written by Paolo Gregoletto